Michael Marisi Ornstein (born 1963) is an American actor. 
He is best known for his recurring role as Chucky Marstein on Sons of Anarchy 2008–2014) and its spin-off Mayans M.C. (2019-present).

Early life
Ornstein studied acting as a child at the American Academy of Dramatic Arts in New York City, and later studied under Stella Adler. After high school, he enrolled in the Mason Gross School of the Arts. He quit after his first year and moved to New York City to begin working professionally.

Career
Ornstein's first film credit was for Crossing Delancey, in which he played the minor character Mickey. Television credits include a recurring role as Detective Bonnaventura in Homicide: Life on the Street, and a two-episode arc in Third Watch, as well as parts in Seinfeld, Law & Order, Law & Order: Special Victims Unit, and Law & Order: Criminal Intent.

Ornstein's stage acting credits span twenty-five years' worth of new plays in New York City, in addition to creating the role of Louis Ironson in the 1991 World Premiere of Angels in America at the Eureka Theater in San Francisco.

Ornstein played Chuck "Chucky" Marstein on Sons of Anarchy (2008–2014) and played him on its spin-off Mayans M.C.'' (2018–2019).

Credits

Film

Television

Web series

References

External links

American male television actors
American people of Italian descent
American people of Jewish descent
1963 births
Living people
20th-century American male actors
21st-century American male actors
American Academy of Dramatic Arts alumni
American male film actors
People from Passaic, New Jersey
Male actors from New Jersey
Mason Gross School of the Arts alumni